Fulton Street is a long east–west street in northern Brooklyn, New York City. This street begins at the intersection of Adams Street and Joralemon Street in Brooklyn Heights, and runs eastward to East New York and Cypress Hills. At the border with Queens, Fulton Street becomes 91st Avenue, which ends at 84th Street in Woodhaven.

History
The street is named after Robert Fulton; a street of the same name in Manhattan was linked to this street by Fulton with his steam ferries. For a hundred years before the Fulton Ferry monopoly, Fulton Street was the Ferry Road through Jamaica Pass and, in the centuries before any ferry service, Indian path to the Hempstead Plains.  It began at the Fulton Ferry Landing and climbed south through Brooklyn Heights past Brooklyn Borough Hall to where it now begins at Adams Street. Part of the original Fulton Street survives as Old Fulton Street in Brooklyn Heights and Dumbo, and as Cadman Plaza West in Downtown Brooklyn. The segment of Fulton Street that traveled past Borough Hall has been turned into a pedestrian esplanade.

Route

The initial segment of Fulton Street as it exists today is the Fulton Mall between Adams Street and Flatbush Avenue. East of Flatbush Avenue, Fulton Street becomes a major artery of Downtown Brooklyn, Fort Greene and Clinton Hill. At Franklin Avenue, Fulton Street then becomes the signature street of Bedford–Stuyvesant. At Broadway Junction in East New York, the street is interrupted by the intersection of Broadway and Jamaica Avenue, but continues on the other side as a one-way residential street through East New York and Cypress Hills until Norwood Avenue, once again as a two-way street reaching the Queens border at Elderts Lane in Woodhaven, Queens. There it becomes 91st Avenue, which continues until 84th Street in Queens.

The elevated BMT Fulton Street Line used to run over Fulton Street. The New York City Subway's IND Fulton Street subway line has replaced it east of Washington Avenue. The BMT Jamaica Line runs above Fulton Street between Broadway Junction and Crescent Street.

On March 10, 2005, Fulton Street was co-named Harriet Ross Tubman Avenue along most of its length from Rockaway Avenue in Bedford-Stuyvesant to Elm Place in Downtown Brooklyn, on the anniversary of the death of the ex-slave and abolitionist, which has been designated "Harriet Tubman Day of Commemoration" in New York State.

Fulton Mall

Fulton Mall is a pedestrian street and transit mall in Downtown Brooklyn that runs on Fulton Street between Flatbush Avenue and Adams Street. It contains 230 stores and dedicated bus lanes. For the mall's length, only buses, commercial vehicles, local truck deliveries, and emergency vehicles are allowed to use the street. The center of the mall is an open public space known as Albee Square.

History 

Fulton Street’s first period of great vigor occurred before the era of enclosed shopping malls, the era when huge department stores like Abraham & Strauss, Frederick Loeser & Co. and A.I. Namm & Son reigned on the street. The current era dates from the 1970s, when through the persistent efforts of the street’s merchants, the city agreed to a revitalization program through which it would narrow the roadway, widen the sidewalk, and create, with the exception of buses, a traffic-free shopping area. Architect Lee Harris Pomeroy redesigned the mall in the early 1980s: he designed street furniture and equipment for the project including large, free-standing canopies, vendors’ kiosks, directory and telephone kiosks, and high mast lighting. The graphics program he also designed for the project consists of informational, directional and street signage. Pomeroy's renovation was completed in 1984 and received an Albert S. Bard Award from the City Club of New York.

The area is New York City's third-largest commercial center after Herald Square and a stretch of Madison Avenue. The mall has attracted major investments from prominent Brooklyn retail real estate developers such as Stanley Chera, Albert Laboz, Joseph Jemal, Raymond M. Chera, and Eli Gindi.

Developments 

Fulton Mall includes major retailers such as Macy's, H&M, Gap, GameStop, Foot Locker, Modell's Sporting Goods, and Finish Line. The Fulton Mall Improvement Association is the local business improvement district. According to the Improvement Association, in 2003 the Fulton Mall area saw between 100,000 and 125,000 visitors a day. The mall has spurred additional commercial development in its immediate vicinity, such as the City Point development, and has become the most expensive place to do business in downtown Brooklyn. Fulton Street's retail space was $301 per square foot in 2016 and $326 per square foot in 2017.

The Macy's store at 422 Fulton Street was originally Abraham & Straus's flagship store. The building was designed in Art Deco style by Starrett & Van Vleck and built in 1933. It was formerly the showroom for the W.C. Vosburgh Mfg. Co. As of 2017, the building is undergoing a $194 million renovation by Tishman Speyer. Its new portion will have 10 floors dedicated to Class A office space. Macy's is also renovating its part of the building.

The Offerman Building on Fulton Mall was built in 1893 by Henry Offerman, a businessman in the sugar industry. It was designed in the Romanesque Revival architectural style and originally hosted retail on the ground floor. The Offerman Building was designated a New York City Historic Landmark in 2005, and by 2017 had been converted into a 121-unit residential complex.

See also
 Smith & Gray Company Building

References

External links

 Map of Fulton Mall
 MetroTech BID
 Fulton Mall at about.com Brooklyn Site
 Co-naming:
 Image of co-naming
 City Comptroller William Thompson's speech of dedication
 An argument for full renaming and context on other Brooklyn street name changes

Downtown Brooklyn
Bedford–Stuyvesant, Brooklyn
Clinton Hill, Brooklyn
Fort Greene, Brooklyn
East New York, Brooklyn
Streets in Brooklyn